Emil Teodorovich Kio (né Emil Teodorovich Girshfeld-Renard) (11 April 1894 – 19 December 1965) was Soviet illusionist, People's Artist of the RSFSR.  

His sons, Igor Kio and Emil Kio, Jr., became famous Soviet magicians as well.

References

1894 births
1965 deaths
Artists from Moscow
Honored Artists of the RSFSR
People's Artists of the RSFSR
Recipients of the Order of the Red Banner of Labour
Russian magicians
Soviet magicians

Burials at Novodevichy Cemetery